Valdosta is an acoustic EP from Tallahassee rock band Mayday Parade.

Composition
"Jamie All Over" was originally a song by Kid Named Chicago, the previous band of Jake Bundrick, Alex Garcia, and Jason Lancaster. It was later re-recorded on Mayday Parade's debut album A Lesson in Romantics. The end of this song is sung by Daniel Lancaster, Jason's brother, much as it is on the version on A Lesson in Romantics.
Both "Kids in Love" and "Bruised and Scarred" had appeared on from Mayday Parade's second album Anywhere but Here.
"Your Song" is from Mayday Parade's debut EP Tales Told by Dead Friends.
Jake Bundrick sings all of the parts originally sung by Jason Lancaster.
"Amber Lynn" and "Terrible Things" were both new songs.

Release and reception
"Terrible Things" was released for streaming on February 22, 2011. Valdosta was released by Atlantic and Fearless on March 8. Valdosta was the name of a town that the band used to record their early material in. Reception from both fans and critics have been mainly positive, except for long-term fans who were unwilling to accept the band's current sound.

Track listing
"Amber Lynn" (Mayday Parade) – 3:53
"Jamie All Over" (Mayday Parade, Jason Lancaster) – 4:03
"Kids in Love" (Mayday Parade, Gregg Wattenberg) – 3:48
"Your Song" (Mayday Parade, Lancaster) – 4:09
"Bruised and Scarred" (Mayday Parade, Bobby Huff, David Bendeth) – 3:22
"Terrible Things" (Mayday Parade) – 3:58

Personnel
Derek Sanders – lead vocals, keyboard
Jake Bundrick – vocals, drums
Alex Garcia – lead guitar
Brooks Betts – rhythm guitar
Jeremy Lenzo – bass guitar, vocals

Chart positions

References

External links

Valdosta at YouTube (streamed copy where licensed)

2011 EPs
Mayday Parade EPs
Fearless Records EPs
Atlantic Records EPs